"The Secret of Christmas" is a popular Christmas song, written by Sammy Cahn and Jimmy Van Heusen for Bing Crosby, and first performed by Crosby in the 1959 film Say One for Me. He recorded the song with an arrangement by Frank DeVol for a single that year released by Columbia Records.

Crosby recorded the song again in 1964, together with Fred Waring and the Pennsylvanians, for the Reprise Records album 12 Songs of Christmas.

The song has also been covered by numerous artists, including Ella Fitzgerald in 1959, Johnny Mathis (for his album Sounds of Christmas) in 1963, and Julie Andrews (for her album Christmas with Julie Andrews) in 1982.

The Nylons recorded the song for their album Harmony: The Christmas Songs (1994).

Susannah McCorkle recorded the song and it was included in the album A Concord Jazz Christmas (1994).

Shirley Horn - her version of the song can be found in the album Christmas for Lovers (2003)

Captain & Tennille included the song in their album The Secret of Christmas (2007)

Marie Osmond recorded the song for her album Magic of Christmas (2007)

References

External links
 

1959 songs
Bing Crosby songs
American Christmas songs
Songs written for films
Songs with lyrics by Sammy Cahn
Songs with music by Jimmy Van Heusen